The Beersheba Subdistrict is the southernmost subdistrict of Israel and one of two subdistricts in its Southern District. The capital of the subdistrict is, as the name implies, Beersheba. Rahat is the second-largest city and Eilat comes third. Other cities in the subdistrict are Arad, Dimona, Netivot, and Ofakim. Hura and Kseifa have not received city status yet are of similar size. The subdistrict includes an international airport, near Eilat, and a seaport in Eilat.

History 
During the British Mandate of Palestine, most of the present-day subdistrict was included in the Beersheba Subdistrict. Other parts were under the jurisdiction of the Gaza and Hebron subdistricts.

References